Llanddewi Ystradenni is a community in Radnorshire, Powys, Wales. The population of the Community at the 2011 census was 310.

Centred on the village of Llanddewi, within the community is the motte and bailey defensive fortification of Buddugre Castle, overlooking the Afon Ithon.

References

Communities in Powys